The High and the Mighty is the third album by American rock singer Donnie Iris, released in 1982.  The album was reissued in remastered form on CD in 2021 by Rock Candy Records with a live bonus track from the 1981 Live EP.

Track listing

Side one
 "Tough World" (Avsec, Iris, Lee) – 3:48
 "I Wanna Tell Her" (Avsec, Iris) – 4:18
 "Glad All Over" (Clark) – 3:09
 "Parallel Time" (Avsec, Iris) – 4:15

Side two
 "The High and the Mighty" (Avsec, Iris, Lee, McClain, Valentine) – 4:08
 "This Time It Must Be Love" (Avsec, Iris, Lee) – 4:19
 "Love Is Magic" (McClain) – 3:59
 "You're Gonna Miss Me" (Avsec, Iris) – 3:35

2021 remastered CD reissue
 "Tough World" – 3:51
 "I Wanna Tell Her" – 4:22
 "Glad All Over" – 3:11
 "Parallel Time" – 4:18
 "The High and the Mighty" – 4:11
 "This Time It Must Be Love" – 4:20
 "Love Is Magic" – 4:02
 "You're Gonna Miss Me" – 3:37
 "Agnes (Live)" - 4:37

Personnel
Donnie Iris - lead and background vocals
Mark Avsec - piano, organ, synthesizers, background vocals
Marty Lee Hoenes - guitars and background vocals
Albritton McClain - bass guitar and background vocals
Kevin Valentine - drums and percussives

Production
Executive Producer: Carl Maduri
Producer: Mark Avsec
Engineer: Jerry Reed

Chart positions
Album - Billboard (United States)

Singles - Billboard (United States)

References

Donnie Iris albums
1982 albums
Albums produced by Mark Avsec
MCA Records albums